Edward Lake or Lake Edward may refer to:

Lakes
 Lake Edward, a lake in Africa
 Lake Edward (Minnesota), a lake in Minnesota, United States
 Lake Édouard (Quebec), a lake in Upper-Batiscanie, Quebec, Canada

Place name
Lake Edward, Victoria County, New Brunswick, Canada
Lac-Édouard, Quebec, a municipality in Upper-Batiscanie, Quebec, Canada

People
 Edward Lake (priest) (1641–1704), English churchman
 Edward Lake (politician) (1835–1908), New Zealand Member of Parliament
 Sir Edward Lake, 1st Baronet (c.1597-1674) of the Lake Baronets
 Eddie Lake (1916–1995), American baseball player 
 Eddie Lake (footballer) (1951–2020), Australian rules footballer

Lake, Edward